Barrancas (Neuquén) is a village and municipality in Neuquén Province in southwestern Argentina.

Population
Barrancas has a population of 813 as of 2001, which shows an 80.2% increase over the previous census in 1991 when the population was 451.

References

Populated places in Neuquén Province